Ramagundam B Super Thermal Power Plant is located at Ramagundam in Telangana. The power plant is one of the coal based power plants of TSGENCO

Power Plant
Ramagundam B Thermal Power Station has an installed capacity of 62.5 MW (single unit). The unit was commissioned in October, 1971 with the financial assistance of U.S.A.I.D with the project cost of Rs 14.8 crores.

With the installation of Electrostatic precipitator in 1987 under the R&M Scheme, the problems associated with ID Fan etc. has been overcome and station has been running satisfactorily.

The station has achieved the height plant load factor in all India level for four times in the group of 62.5 MW to 63.5 MW units.

Installed Capacity

References 

Coal-fired power stations in Telangana
Karimnagar district
1971 establishments in Andhra Pradesh